Metin Şahin (born January 10, 1963 in Konya, Turkey) is a European champion Turkish former taekwondo practitioner, who serves as the president of the Turkey Taekwondo Federation since 2003.Also In 2019, He was appointed dean to the Faculty of Sport Sciences at Selçuk University.

Early life and academic career
He was born in Konya, where he completed his primary and secondary education. Metin Şahin graduated in 1987 from the School of Physical Education and Sports of the Gazi University in Ankara. In 1988, he was appointed instructor for physical education and sports at the Selçuk University in his hometown. During his service at the university, he initiated the establishment of Taekwondo training at sports schools of many Turkish universities, and so contributed to widespread of this sports branch. He achieved a master's degree in 1992. In 2002, Şahin received a Ph.D. degree with a thesis on Taekwondo training from the Selçuk University. Since 2003, Şahin is assistant professor at the same university. He is author of a number of scientific publications and books on Taekwondo training.

Sports
He began with Taekwondo in 1975. In 1982, Şahin became Turkish champion, and was selected to the national team the next year. He served several years as the captain of the national team. Between 1984 and 1994, he competed at world and European championships, and represented Turkey at two Pre Olympic Games. In 1995, 1986 and 1991 he was honored "Sportsperson of the Year" by the Turkish media.

Şahin was elected in November 2003 president of the Turkey Taekwondo Federation. In August 2004, he became a board member of the World Taekwondo Federation (WTF). The next year, he was re-elected to the board, and was appointed chairman of the youth commission of the WTF. In October 2007, he was elected to the board of European Taekwondo Union (ETU), where he presides the Balkan countries commission.

Achievements
1984
 5th European Taekwondo Championships in Stuttgart, Germany - 
 Antalya Tournament in Turkey - 
 Austria-Turkey Biletaral Tournament in Austria - 
 Belgium Open Tournament - 

1985
 1st Mediterranean Cup in Yugoslavia-  
 7th World Seniors Taekwondo Championships in Seoul, South Korea - 
 Helsinki Open Tournament in Finland - 
 Cyprus Tournament - 

1986
 1st ETU Presidentship Tournament in Izmir, Turkey - 
 European Taekwondo Championships in Seefeld, Austria - 
 Belgium Open Tournament - 

1987
 Belgium Open Tournament - 

1988
 7th European Taekwondo Championships in Ankara, Turkey - 
 Pre Olympic Games in Seoul, South Korea - 

1990
 Centenary Friendship Tournament in Japan - 
 8th European Taekwondo Championships in Aarhus, Denmark - 

1991
 10th World Seniors Taekwondo Championships in Athens, Greece -

References

1963 births
Sportspeople from Konya
Living people
Turkish male taekwondo practitioners
Olympic taekwondo practitioners of Turkey
Taekwondo practitioners at the 1988 Summer Olympics
Taekwondo practitioners at the 1992 Summer Olympics
Gazi University alumni
Academic staff of Selçuk University
Turkish non-fiction writers
Turkish referees and umpires
Members of the 21st Parliament of Turkey
Members of the 20th Parliament of Turkey
European Taekwondo Championships medalists
World Taekwondo Championships medalists
Turkish sports executives and administrators
20th-century Turkish people